Percopsis is a small genus of percopsiform fishes native to North America, with these two recognized species:
 Percopsis omiscomaycus (Walbaum, 1792) (trout-perch)
 Percopsis transmontana (C. H. Eigenmann & R. S. Eigenmann, 1892) (sand roller)

References

Percopsiformes
Ray-finned fish genera